

The Tramway touristique de l'Aisne (Aisne Tourist Tramway) is the official designation of the tourist use of a former rural vicinal tramway in Belgium.

The line is the oldest and longest tramway in the province of Luxembourg, between Érezée and Dochamps. It is a  gauge line along the Aisne river.

The extension from Forge à la Plez and Dochamps to Lamorménil was opened by Prince Laurent of Belgium on 21 June 2015.

See also 
 Tram
 Vicinal tramway • Belgian Coast Tram • Tram de Han
 List of town tramway systems in Belgium

External links 

  Press file
  Official web site of the TTA

Tram transport in Belgium
Metre gauge railways in Belgium
Heritage railways in Belgium
Tourist attractions in Luxembourg (Belgium)
Érezée
Manhay